The Koniambo mine is a large mine in the north of New Caledonia in the North Province. It is closest to the small town of Voh, on the west coast of the island. Nickel is found on the Koniambo Massif, and taken by conveyor to a new smelter on the coast. Koniambo has one of the largest nickel reserves in New Caledonia, with around 151 million tonnes of ore grading at 2.58% nickel. Each 62.5 million tonnes of ore contains 4 million tonnes of nickel metal.

Koniambo has been exploited prior to the Second World War by SLN, the French-owned company that controlled 90% of nickel production on the islands at that time, but had since ceased.

Discussions begun to extend mining on the massif in the 1990s after deals had been struck to give some political independence to the new northern Province, dominated by the Kanak, after violent clashes between French loyalists and independence supporters in the 1980s. Northern Kanak interests sought an industrial project that could give them a measure of economic independence from France. The signing of the ‘Bercy Agreements’ in 1998 permitted development to proceed, but required a new port, power station to fuel the country's second nickel smelter, and an 11 km long conveyor from the massif to the smelter. The brokering of this deal by André Dang Van Nha, an important industrialist sympathetic to Kanak interests, and other key individuals involved a swap of mining titles with other SLN nickel mines, political interventions, and clever bargaining to provide financing and a supply of nickel to the smelter development. The US$5.3 billion plant at Vavouto is now operated by Koniambo Nickel SAS (KNS), a joint venture between the Northern Province’s SMSP and the transnational conglomerate Glencore-Xstrata. The Northern Province has a 51% share, making this one of the largest mines in the world with majority Indigenous ownership and control.

The mine and smelter started production in 2014, unfortunately at a time when nickel prices were low, and production targets have not yet been met due to series of problems with the smelter.  André Dang, now in his 70s, is still President and CEO of SMSP, and strongly protective of New Caledonian ownership in its mining interests. By a quirk of fate, he was born at Koniambo to an indentured Vietnamese labourer in 1936, and his father, who died in 1937 in a mining accident, is buried at Voh.

References 

Nickel mines in New Caledonia